Vyacheslav Yevgenyevich Pozgalyov (born 15 November 1946) is a Russian retired politician, who served as governor of Vologda Oblast from 1996–2011. He was born in Pyongyang, North Korea to a family of Smersh officer. He was raised in the Far East and Cherepovets, Vologda Oblast.

He became the governor in 1996. Prior to that, he was the mayor of Cherepovets. He tendered his resignation on December 12, 2011. He last served as a member of the State Duma until 2016.

Honours and awards
 Order of Merit for the Fatherland;
2nd class (3 December 1999) - for outstanding contribution to strengthening Russian statehood, and socio-economic development of the region
3rd class (14 November 1996) - for services to the state and many years of diligent work
4th class (20 September 2011) - for outstanding contribution to the socio-economic development of the field and many years of honest work
 Order of Honour (5 August 2003) - for outstanding contribution to the socio-economic development of the field and years of diligent work
 Order of Friendship (15 November 2006) - for outstanding contribution to the socio-economic development of the field and years of diligent work
 Order of the Badge of Honour (1985)
 Honour of the sign "Public recognition" - for the efficient operation of the economy and the successful solution of the social programs of the Vologda region
 Commemorative Medal "For Assistance" (Interior Ministry of Russia, 2011)

References

1946 births
Recipients of the Order "For Merit to the Fatherland", 2nd class
Recipients of the Order of Honour (Russia)
Living people
Governors of Vologda Oblast
United Russia politicians
21st-century Russian politicians
People from Pyongyang
Members of the Federation Council of Russia (1994–1996)
Members of the Federation Council of Russia (1996–2000)
Sixth convocation members of the State Duma (Russian Federation)